The 2010 Porsche Tennis Grand Prix was a women's tennis tournament played on indoor clay courts. It was the 33rd edition of the Porsche Tennis Grand Prix, and was part of the Premier tournaments of the 2010 WTA Tour. It took place at the Porsche Arena in Stuttgart, Germany, from 24 April until 2 May  2010. Seven of the top ten ranked women and four former world number ones participated in the event. Justine Henin won the singles title.

Entrants

Seeds

 Rankings are as of April 19, 2010.

Other entrants
The following players received wildcards into the main draw:
  Julia Görges
  Justine Henin
  Samantha Stosur

The following players received entry from the qualifying draw:
  Margalita Chakhnashvili (as a Lucky loser)
  Anna Lapushchenkova
  Tsvetana Pironkova
  Tatiana Poutchek
  Selima Sfar

Finals

Singles

 Justine Henin defeated  Samantha Stosur, 6–4, 2–6, 6–1
It was Henin's first title of the year and 42nd of her career. It was her 2nd win at the event, also winning in 2007.

Doubles

 Gisela Dulko /  Flavia Pennetta defeated  Květa Peschke /  Katarina Srebotnik, 3–6, 7–6(7–3), [10–5]

External links
 Official website

Porsche Tennis Grand Prix
Porsche Tennis Grand Prix
2010 in German tennis
2010s in Baden-Württemberg
Porsch